Lake Kahrila is a lake of Estonia.

See also
List of lakes of Estonia

Kahrila
Rõuge Parish
Kahrila